Mycobacterium virus Patience, also called Patience, is a bacteriophage that infects Mycobacterium smegmatis bacteria. The large difference between the GC content of this virus's genome (50.3%) and that of its host (67.4%) indicate Patience likely evolved among bacteria of lower GC content but was able to infect M. smegmatis as well. It is the only species of the genus Patiencevirus.

References

External links
 Mycobacteriophage Database: Patience

Mycobacteriophages
Siphoviridae